"What Have I Done to Deserve This?" is a song by English synth-pop duo Pet Shop Boys and soul singer Dusty Springfield, taken from the duo's second studio album, Actually (1987). The song was released as the second single from the album on 10 August 1987.

A commercial success in both the United Kingdom and United States, the song helped revive Springfield's career and led to a resurgence of interest in her music. Following the single, the Pet Shop Boys wrote and produced the singles "Nothing Has Been Proved" and "In Private" for Springfield, both included on her album Reputation (1990).

Background
"What Have I Done to Deserve This?" marked Pet Shop Boys' first major collaboration with another recording artist.

The song was originally written and demoed around Christmas 1984 with the assistance of notable American songwriter Allee Willis It was originally intended for use on Please, but the problem was to decide who’d sing the other half of the duet. Various contemporary singers were suggested to them, but none of them seemed suitable for the song. Eventually their manager’s assistant suggested Dusty Springfield, whose album Dusty in Memphis (from 1969) was often acknowledged by Neil Tennant as his favourite LP.

According to Tennant, EMI—their record label Parlophone's parent company—did not want the duo to work with Springfield, instead suggesting Tina Turner or Barbra Streisand for the collaboration. Springfield's career had declined from its peak in the 1960s, with her last top 40 entry on the UK Singles Chart being "How Can I Be Sure" in 1970. The Independents Adam Sweeting described the ensuing years for Springfield as "a litany of unmemorable albums, while her private life became a free-fall into drugs, alcohol and self-mutilation". However, Tennant was insistent on choosing Springfield for the song.

Initially, within a few weeks of sending a tape of the song to Springfield’s manager, word came back that she wasn’t interested in doing the duet, so the song was left off Please. Springfield was unfamiliar with Pet Shop Boys, however, she heard "West End Girls" on the radio and liked the song. Several months later, the duo’s manager heard back from her manager saying she wanted to do the duet. According to Tennant, Springfield was without a recording contract by the time of their collaboration. Springfield, at the time living in California, returned to London for the song's recording just before Christmas 1986. According to Chris Welch of The Independent, Springfield "didn't know quite what the group wanted", but Tennant explained to her they wanted her distinctive "husky, breathy voice" to feature.

Tennant recalls of the vocal session with Springfield:

Composition
"What Have I Done to Deserve This?" is a synth-pop song composed in the key of A minor. According to its sheet music, it features the moderate tempo of 120 beats per minute. In a review for AllMusic, Ned Raggett states the track "springs to life with a seemingly off-kilter drum break, then slides right into a smart, deceptively simple, and full-bodied combination of big drums and sparkling keyboards."

Written by Neil Tennant, Chris Lowe and Allee Willis in early 1985, Classic Pop noted the song's somewhat peculiar structure reflects the way it was composed: "Lowe wrote the riff and the music for the 'I bought you drinks, I bought you flowers' section; Tennant came up with the verse; and Willis wrote the 'Since you went away' part." Tennant wrote the majority of the lyrics while on the bus home from his job at Smash Hits. Lyrically, Sound on Sound describes the song as "a number about the mundane lives of bored '80s yuppies", while according to Nick Levine for the BBC, the lyrics "reflect the emphasis placed on personal financial gain during the Thatcher and Reagan years", with the song's opening lines being "You always wanted a lover, I only wanted a job."

The track was recorded at Advision Studios, and produced by Stephen Hague, engineered by David Jacob and mixed by Julian Mendelsohn, who co-produced Actually, at Sarm West Studios. While Tennant's vocal recording was relatively straightforward, Springfield was very particular with her vocals, according to Mendelsohn, who said: "Even though Dusty was a great singer, she was very long‑winded when it came to getting the vocals right to her own satisfaction [...] I remember Neil [Tennant] and I looking at each other as if to say, 'Christ, this is going to take forever.' And it did take forever. We ended up having to sift our way through 20 tracks of vocals, but we got a fantastic result in the end, at which point we looked at each other as if to say, 'Well, that's why she took so long.'"

Critical reception
In a contemporary review in Smash Hits, Vici McDonald wrote: "The brilliant thing about the Pet Shop Boys is that they get everything right – memorable tunes, perfect production, intelligent lyrics, excellent sleeves, loads of style and a self-deprecating sense of humour – a very rare combination. So, having decided to do a duet with a soulful chicklet, they've naturally got the best – '60s songstress and living legend Dusty Springfield."

In a 2017 article for NME, Nick Levine called it "possibly the greatest pop song in history", writing: "We can chat 'hooks' and 'unusual structure' all you want, but this song just has that thing: before it's even finished, you already want to play it again."

Included in a feature of the best duets of all time by The Daily Telegraph, writer Catherine Gee characterised the track as a "deceptively bouncy song of lovelorn misery was clearly written for two of the most idiosyncratic voices in pop. Neil Tennant raps a lugubrious verse about spilt drinks and wilting flowers, before Dusty floats in with a raspy whisper stained by life's disappointments." Craig Mclean of the same publication described the song as "a verifiable Eighties classic", a view echoed by The Independents Graeme Ross, who called the song one of Springfield's best, writing: "An unmistakable and unforgettable Dusty vocal was layered over trademark Pet Shop Boys synth-pop and the result was an Eighties classic." Caroline Westbrook of Metro called it "a thing of beauty" in an article on the chart hits of 1987.

American LGBT magazine The Advocate included the song in a list of the 10 best queer duets, calling it one of "pop music's most memorable LGBT pairings". Singer David McAlmont called "What Have I Done to Deserve This?" his "unassailable favourite song" of Springfield's in a feature published in The Observer celebrating pop music's landmark gay moments, describing her vocal performance as "a profound interpretation of [songwriter] Allee Willis's sugary chorus".

Commercial performance
When released as a single in August 1987, "What Have I Done to Deserve This?" Became a top 3 hit on both sides of the Atlantic. 

In the United Kingdom it debuted at number 10 before peaking at number 2, where it remained for two consecutive weeks. 

In the United States “What Have I Done to Deserve This” peaked at number 2 on the Billboard Hot 100, becoming the fourth top ten hit for Pet Shop Boys as well as the biggest hit of Springfield's career in the United States. It was kept out of the #1 spot by George Michael's, "Father Figure".

The song also helped revive Springfield’s career and led to an increase of sales and interest in her previous songs. The single made it to number 1 on the Irish singles chart, where it was Pet Shop Boys' second number 1 hit in the space of just six weeks.

Music video
The music video was filmed at the O2 Brixton Academy in London, featuring a female chorus line and male members of the pit orchestra. It made significant use of the theatre drapes and stage curtains for dramatic effect. Like all the singles taken from the album Actually (1987), the song also appears on the film It Couldn't Happen Here (1988), where it is briefly played in instrumental form, without vocals.

Live performances
Pet Shop Boys and Dusty Springfield performed the song for the 1988 Brit Awards. Since Springfield's death in 1999, Pet Shop Boys have performed the song live several times with guest performers singing Springfield's parts. In 2000, singer Cerys Matthews performed the song with Pet Shop Boys during their set at Glastonbury Festival. At the 2009 Brit Awards, where the duo received an Outstanding Contribution to Music award, Pet Shop Boys performed the song with Lady Gaga. During their 2019 headline set at Radio 2 Live in Hyde Park, the duo were joined by Beverley Knight to perform the song.

Track listings
 7" Parlophone / R 6163 (UK)
 "What Have I Done to Deserve This?" – 4:19
 "A New Life" – 4:55

 12" Parlophone / 12 R 6163 (UK)
 "What Have I Done to Deserve This?" (Extended Mix) – 6:53
 "A New Life" – 4:55
 "What Have I Done to Deserve This?" (Disco Mix) – 8:13
also available on CD (Parlophone / CD R 6163)

 12" EMI-Manhattan / V-56080 (US - First Issue)
 "What Have I Done to Deserve This?" (Disco Mix) – 8:17
 "Rent" (Extended Mix) – 7:06

 12" EMI-Manhattan / V-56080 (US - Second Issue)
 "What Have I Done to Deserve This?" (The Shep Pettibone Remix) – 8:28
 "What Have I Done to Deserve This?" (Dub Mix) – 6:53
 "Rent" (The François Kevorkian Remix) – 7:04
 "I Want a Dog" – 4:48

Charts

Weekly charts

Year-end charts

Certifications

References

1987 singles
1987 songs
Dusty Springfield songs
Cashbox number-one singles
Irish Singles Chart number-one singles
Male–female vocal duets
Parlophone singles
Pet Shop Boys songs
Song recordings produced by Stephen Hague
Songs written by Allee Willis
Songs written by Chris Lowe
Songs written by Neil Tennant